Elena Gabriela Voicu (born 28 April 1990) is a Romanian handballer who plays for Rapid București.

Achievements 
Liga Naţională:
Winner: 2022
Silver Medalist: 2017
Bronze Medalist: 2014, 2018

References
 

  
1990 births
Living people
People from Slobozia
Romanian female handball players